Förvaltare is a Swedish military rank (OR-8) for Specialist Officers above Fanjunkare and below Regementsförvaltare in the army and Flottiljförvaltare in the Air force and is translated to Sergeant Major. The original military meaning of the word 'Förvaltare' was the same as 'Conductor', as in a Warrant Officer Conductor of Ordnance Stores or Quartermaster Stores.

Promotion
For promotion to Förvaltare, 16 years time-in-service, and a minimum of four years time-in-grade as Fanjunkare is required, as well as HSOU (Sergeant Majors Academy). A Förvaltare has the same relative rank as a Kapten.

Duties
 Förvaltare are Specialist Officers at Skill Levels C (Advanced) and D (Expert).
 As a functional specialist the Förvaltare serves in units and higher staffs as a staff member/functional expert in one or more areas. Examples of positions are functional staff officers, development officers, instructors at schools and centers. Late in the career, positions at the Defence Materiel Administration or at the Swedish Armed Forces Headquarters may be relevant.
 As senior advisors the Förvaltare serves as executive officers or senior advisors to the commanding officer. Positions are e.g. Battalion Sergeant Major, or second-in-command or commanding officer of a Headquarters and service company.

Earlier rank insignia

See also
 Military ranks of the Swedish armed forces
 Swedish Armed Forces

References

The Swedish Armed Forces official website - military ranks (accessed on July 13, 2007) (in Swedish)
USA enlisted ranks
Implementation of two career path system for officers
Officer Training

Military ranks of the Swedish Army